VIP is a 2019 South Korean television series starring Jang Na-ra, Lee Sang-yoon, Lee Chung-ah, Kwak Sun-young, Pyo Ye-jin and Shin Jae-ha. It aired on SBS TV's Mondays and Tuesdays at 22:00 (KST) time slot from October 28 to December 24, 2019.

Synopsis
The story of Sung Un Department Store's team who works for the VIP clients which constitute the top 1% of their customers.

One day after a receiving a text message about her husband's infidelity from an anonymous source, Na Jeong-seon (Jang Na-ra) begins to suspect her husband and her colleagues of having an affair. In her quest to discover the truth, she ends up revealing more than one secret that her colleagues are hiding.

Cast

Main

VIP Team
 Jang Na-ra as Na Jeong-seon
 Wife and colleague to Park Seong-joon. She is from an affluent family and got a high-level job at Sung Un Department Store without much difficulty, after graduating from a prestigious university.
 Lee Sang-yoon as Park Seong-joon
 The team leader of Sung Un Department Store's VIP Management Team and Na Jeong-seon's husband.
 Lee Chung-ah as Lee Hyeon-ah
 A professional and fashionable section chief of VIP Management Team. She has recently returned from a year off work due to a former scandal with her boss, who was in charge of HR.
 Kwak Sun-young as Song Mi-na
 A working mother of two young sons who had missed a few promotions due to multiple maternity leaves, despite having worked for six years in the company.
 Pyo Ye-jin as On Yoo-ri
 She comes from a poor family and fights for survival. She becomes the center of office gossip after landing a job at Sung Un Department Store's VIP Management Team. Her hiring caused the team members’ lives to change.
 Shin Jae-ha as Ma Sang-woo
 A new employee at the VIP Management Team. He has been brought up in comfortable surroundings, with a prestigious education.

Supporting

Sung Un Department Store
 Jung Joon-won as Cha Jin-ho
 Lee Jae-won as Lee Byeong-hoon, Mi-na's husband
 Park Sung-geun as Ha Jae-woong
 Jang Hyuk-jin as Bae Do-il
 Cho Seung-yeon as Ha Young-woong
 Lee Jin-hee as Kang Ji-young

Others
 Kim Mi-kyung as Key Mi-ok
 Choi Hong-il as Na Young-chul
 Jung Ae-ri as Han Sook-young
 Sora Jung as Han Sook-ja
 Bae Hae-sun as Gil-ja
 Jang Hyun-sung as Jang Jin-chul
 Yoon Ji-on as Kim Min-ki
 Oh Se-young as Han So-mi
 Jeon Hye-jin as Lee Byung-eun

Special appearances
 Oh Ah-rin as Ha Rim
 Bae Hae-sun as a nouveau riche VIP customer
 Yu-bin as  Cha Se-rin
 Seo Woo-jin as Seo-jin
 Soy Kim as Ria
 Lee Ki-chan as Daniel
 Shim Hee-sub as Chef Michael

Episodes

Production
The first script reading took place on April 18, 2019. Filming began on May 9 and ended on October 26, 2019, two days before the premiere of the series.

Reception

Viewership

Accolades

Notes

References

External links
  
 
 

Seoul Broadcasting System television dramas
Korean-language television shows
2019 South Korean television series debuts
2019 South Korean television series endings
South Korean mystery television series
South Korean pre-produced television series
Adultery in television
Television series by Studio S